Clayman is the fifth studio album by Swedish heavy metal band In Flames, released via Nuclear Blast on 3 July 2000. It has a dark theme, with most of the lyrics dealing with depression and internal struggles. Clayman is the final In Flames album to feature their original melodic death metal sound. The band would later start to experiment with other styles on their next release, Reroute to Remain, gradually progressing these more experimental elements across their future releases later into the 2000s. Like on some songs on the previous album Colony the band tuned their guitars to drop A# on the songs Pinball Map and ...As the Future Repeats Today.

The album's cover art is based on Leonardo da Vinci's Vitruvian Man drawing.  The Jester Head appears in the background, both on the cover, and in the album booklet itself. Music videos were produced for the songs "Pinball Map" (directed by Tamara Jordan) and "Only for the Weak".

Reception

In 2005, Clayman was ranked No. 448 in Rock Hard magazine's book "The 500 Greatest Rock & Metal Albums of All Time". In 2020, it was named one of the 20 best metal albums of 2000 by Metal Hammer magazine.

In 2020, "Bullet Ride", "Pinball Map", "Only for the Weak", and the title track were re-recorded for a 20th-anniversary edition of the album. Fan responses to the re-recordings have been mixed.

Track listing

Apart from remastered versions of the original songs, the 20th Anniversary Edition features the following tracks:

Personnel

In Flames
Anders Fridén – vocals
Björn Gelotte – lead guitar
Jesper Strömblad – rhythm guitar
Peter Iwers – bass
Daniel Svensson – drums

Additional personnel
Charlie Storm – programming, synthesizer
Christopher Amott (formerly of Arch Enemy) – guitar solo on "Suburban Me"
Fredrik Nordström – additional programming, synthesizer, recording, production
In Flames – recording, production
Axel Hermann – artwork, layout
Tobias Lundgren – photography

Charts

References

External links
Details about In Flames albums

In Flames albums
2000 albums
Nuclear Blast albums
Albums produced by Fredrik Nordström